is a centre for the performing arts in Kumamoto, Kumamoto Prefecture, Japan.

History
It opened in 1982 and has two main spaces: a concert hall that seats 1,813 and a theatre that seats 1,183. Maekawa Kunio was the architect, with acoustical design by Nagata Acoustics.

References

External links
 Homepage

Buildings and structures in Kumamoto
Concert halls in Japan
Theatres in Japan
Music venues completed in 1982
1982 establishments in Japan